Ryan Ariehaan (born March 4, 1979) is an Indonesian professional racing cyclist.

Major results

2004
 1st Stage 6 Tour d'Indonesia
2005
 4th Overall Tour d'Indonesia
2007
 1st  Road Race, Southeast Asian Games
2008
 2nd National Road Race Championships
2009
 Southeast Asian Games
1st  Time trial
8th Road race
2010
 9th Tour de Jakarta 
2011
 6th Road race, Southeast Asian Games
2013
 4th Time trial, Southeast Asian Games
2016
 6th Tour de Jakarta
2017
 4th Overall Tour de Selangor

External links

1979 births
Living people
Indonesian male cyclists
Southeast Asian Games medalists in cycling
Southeast Asian Games gold medalists for Indonesia
Competitors at the 2007 Southeast Asian Games
Competitors at the 2009 Southeast Asian Games
20th-century Indonesian people
21st-century Indonesian people